Cameron Dolan (born March 7, 1990) is an American rugby union player who normally plays at the Number 8 position. He currently plays professionally for the NOLA Gold, since 2018, in the Major League Rugby (MLR). Dolan previously played rugby outside the United States at professional level.

Early career
Dolan began playing rugby in high school with the Naples Bears in Florida, although he did spend a very successful term in the 1st XV at St Edward’s school in Cheltenham before playing college rugby at Life University in Atlanta, Georgia. Dolan played with Life University at the Collegiate Rugby Championship, and was named to the CRC All-Tournament team in 2012 and 2013. At Life University, Dolan was a four-time First Team All-American, and won a National Championship in 2013.

Club career
Dolan's performance against the Maori in November 2013 was seen by Jim Mallinder, Head Coach of Northampton Saints, who offered Dolan a professional contract with the Saints. Dolan was brought in as an injury replacement for James Craig. Dolan joined fellow U.S. international Samu Manoa at the club. Dolan did not make any first team appearances for Northampton during the 2013–14 season. However, he made several appearances for the Saints' sevens team and second side, Wanderers. His strong performances in training earned him a one-year extension with Saints for the 2014–15 Premiership season. Dolan made his professional debut for Northampton Saints on January 31, 2015 in the Anglo Welsh Cup.

Following two seasons with Saints, Dolan joined Cardiff Blues for the 2015-16 Pro 12 season.

International career
Dolan first appeared on the International scene during 2009, where he was named captain of the United States U20's team for the 2009 IRB Junior World Rugby Trophy. At this time he was the United States Rugby Foundation Development Grant Recipient, which is a foundation to develop and improve upcoming rugby talent in the United States.

His efforts for the Under 20s side and his club side landed Dolan in the United States senior side for the 2013 IRB Pacific Nations Cup, the inaugural year for the United States in the competition. He made his full International debut at No.8 against Fiji, as a replacement for captain Todd Clever who was unable to play this match due to injury. His third and fourth cap, came when the USA faced Canada in Round 3 of the 2015 Rugby World Cup Americas qualifications, which ended in a 2–0 defeat thus parachuting USA down to the NACRA-CONSUR playoff final.

In October 2013, Dolan was named captain for the USA Select XV side in the 2013 Americas Rugby Championship. He led the side to two victories; against Canada A and Uruguay. Following this Championship, Dolan was named in the American squad for their 2013 end-of-year rugby union tests. He was named Man of the Match in their opening game against the Māori All Blacks, picking up a try at the 71st minute.

At the conclusion of 2013, Dolan was named the U.S. Breakout Player of the Year by Rugby Mag. 

Dolan was the starting No. 8 for the USA when they achieved their first-ever win over a Tier 1 nation, Scotland in 2018. Dolan became the USA Eagle with the most victories at 30 wins in 59 appearances, following the USA's victory over Chile in 2023 World Cup qualifying.

International tries

References

External links
 
 USA Eagles
 Northampton Saints

American rugby union players
Northampton Saints players
1990 births
Living people
American expatriates in England
Expatriate rugby union players in England
Rugby union flankers
Rugby union number eights
Rugby union locks
New Orleans Gold players
Life University alumni
Sportspeople from Fort Myers, Florida
United States international rugby union players
Cardiff Rugby players
San Diego Legion players
Nottingham R.F.C. players